Under the Doctor is a 1976 British sex comedy directed by Gerry Poulson and starring Barry Evans, Liz Fraser and Hilary Pritchard. The screenplay concerns a Harley Street doctor who enjoys a number of dalliances with three of his female patients.

It was shot at Isleworth Studios and on location around London.

Cast
 Barry Evans as Doctor Boyd, Psychiatrist / Mr Johnson / Lt Cranshaw / Colin Foster
 Liz Fraser as Sandra
 Hilary Pritchard as Lady Victoria Stockbridge
 Penny Spencer as Marion Parson
 Jonathan Cecil as Rodney Harrington-Harrington / Lord Woodbridge
 Elizabeth Counsell as Nurse Addison
 Peter Cleall as Wilkins, Butler

References

External links

1976 films
1970s sex comedy films
1970s English-language films
British sex comedy films
Films shot at Isleworth Studios
Films set in London
1976 comedy films
1970s British films